This is a list of songs recorded by Indian female playback singer Sunidhi Chauhan

Hindi song

1996

1999

2000

2001

2002

2003

2004

2005

2006

2007

2008

2009

2010

2011

2012

2013

2014

2015

2016

2017

2018

2019

2020

2021

2022

2023

Unreleased

Hindi Non-Film songs

Punjabi songs

Pakistani film songs

Marathi films

English songs

Tamil films

Kannada films

Telugu films

Malayalam films 
 Anthiponvettam – Jashne Jawani
 Kandahar – Dheemee Dheemee
 Dracula 2012 – Prince of Darkness
 Samrajyam II: Son of Alexander – Kettu Pottiya Pole
 Sye Raa Narasimha Reddy (Dubbed version) — "Sye Raa Title Track" (with Shreya Ghoshal)

Assamese songs

Oriya songs

Bhojpuri songs 
 Deswa —Sautan Jar Mare

Bengali songs

Film songs

Album songs

Gujarati songs 
 Ratanpur - Ude Aaje
 Family Circus - Todi Didhi Chhe Mein

Television series
 Kkoi Dil Mein Hai – Title Song (with Shreya Ghoshal)
 Shararat – Title Song
 Kaahin Kissii Roz – Title Song
 Kareena Kareena – Title Song
 Raat Hone Ko Hai – Title Song
 Hitler Didi – Title Song
 Kitni Mast Hai Zindagi – Title Song
 Dhoondh Legi Manzil Humein – Title Song
 Zara Nach Ke Dikha 2 – Title Song
 Tumhari Paakhi – Bolo Na Dil Se
 Ek Hasina Thi – Title Track
 Ben 10 – Title Song
 The Casino (web series) - Title Song
Rickshaw (web series) - "Saheli"

Footnotes

References

Chauhan, Sunidhi